Juan Antonio Marín was the defending champion but lost in the first round to Andreas Vinciguerra.

Magnus Norman won in the final 6–1, 7–6(8–6) against Vinciguerra.

Seeds
A champion seed is indicated in bold text while text in italics indicates the round in which that seed was eliminated.

  Magnus Norman (champion)
  Dominik Hrbatý (second round)
  Andreas Vinciguerra (final)
  Juan Ignacio Chela (first round)
  Albert Portas (quarterfinals)
  Jeff Tarango (quarterfinals)
  Mikael Tillstrom (first round)
  Richard Fromberg (first round)

Draw

External links
 2000 Wideyes Swedish Open draw

Men's Singles
Singles